Lasionycta melanographa is a moth of the family Noctuidae. It is found in Afghanistan.

Lasionycta
Moths described in 1973